Armstrongs Mills is an unincorporated community in Belmont County, in the U.S. state of Ohio.

History
Armstrong's Mills was originally called Captina Creek, and under the latter name was platted in 1816. A post office called Armstrong's Mills was established in 1840, and remained in operation until 1986. The namesake Armstrong's Mills was a gristmill built by Thomas Armstrong in 1828.

References

Unincorporated communities in Belmont County, Ohio
1816 establishments in Ohio
Populated places established in 1816
Unincorporated communities in Ohio